Tomás de Torrejón y Velasco Sánchez (23 December 1644 – 23 April 1728) was a Spanish composer, musician and organist based in Peru, associated with the American Baroque.

Life
Torrejón y Velasco was born in Villarrobledo and spent his childhood in the town Fuencarral (now a district of Madrid), the birthplace of his father, Miguel de Torrejón, a huntsman in Philip IV of Spain's employ. In 1658, while still in Spain, he entered into the service of Pedro Fernández de Castro y Andrade, Count of Lemos, who later became the viceroy of Peru. In 1667, he traveled to Lima along with the new viceroy, as one of the viceroy's 113 personal attendants. From 21 November 1667 until 1672 he was superintendent of the armoury at Lima. In 1673 he was appointed magistrate and chief justice of Chachapoyas province, a position he held for four years. In 1676 he was appointed maestro de capilla at the Cathedral of Lima, replacing Juan de Araujo. He remained in that position until his death more than fifty years later in 1728. Torrejón was deeply religious, and adhered unconditionally to the ethical and legal framework of his time, as well as the precepts of the Catholic Church. Married twice (his first wife died) he had a total of six children, five of whom entered religious orders. He died in Lima.

Torrejón's works are some of the most important to the Spanish Baroque movement in the American colonies. Throughout his career as a composer he received wide acclaim; his villancicos were known as far away as Guatemala, and at both Trujillo and Cuzco his opinions were solicited before crucial musical decisions were taken.

Fifteen of his original manuscripts are preserved in the historical archives of the Cathedral of Guatemala. He is the author of the first known opera written in America, La púrpura de la rosa (1701). His rorro (lullaby) was still sung in Cuzco many years after his death. Of particular interest are his polychoral compositions for two organs. A second organ was installed in the Lima Cathedral in 1680 and Torrejón y Velasco composed a polychoral villancico especially for the two organs.

List of works

Opera
 La púrpura de la rosa (1701)

Other works
(with basso continuo unless stated otherwise)
 A este sol peregrino, 4vv
 Aladas gerarquias a quien toca, 7vv
 Angelicas milicias, 12vv
 A Señor que se acerca, 4vv
 Atencion que para hacer en todo cabal la fiesta, 4vv
 Aves flores, 11vv (1683)
 Ave verum corpus, 4vv
 Cantarico que bas a la fuente, 4vv (1678?)
 Desta rosa tan bella, 2vv
 Desvelado dueño mio, 8vv
 Dixit Dominus, 10vv
 Enigma soy viviente, 2vv
 Es mi Rosa bella, vv (1679?)
 Gilguerillo que contas gimiendo, 2vv
 Ha de el ver, 3vv
 Incognito barquero que surcas, 1v
 Lamentation for Wednesday of Holy Week, 8vv
 Luzeros volad, 1–2vv, instruments
 Magnificat sexti toni, 12vv
 Nisi Dominus, 3vv
 Quando el bien que adoro, 2vv
 Quatro plumages ayrosos, 4vv
 Regem cui omnia vivunt, 8vv
 Si el alba sonora se cifra en mi voz, 2vv (1719?)
 Tenganmele señores, 4vv
 Triste caudal de lagrimas, 2vv
 Varquero que surcas, 1v

References
Stein, Louise K (1992), "Torrejón y Velasco, Tomás de" in The New Grove Dictionary of Opera, ed. Stanley Sadie (London)

External links
 A Video of Torrejón's "A este sol peregrino" on YouTube: https://www.youtube.com/watch?v=ZMUqvi5MwX0
 

1644 births
1728 deaths
17th-century classical composers
18th-century classical composers
18th-century male musicians
18th-century keyboardists
Male opera composers
Spanish Baroque composers
Spanish classical organists
Male classical organists
Spanish male classical composers
Spanish opera composers
17th-century male musicians